Hermann Volz was a German weightlifter. He competed in the men's heavyweight event at the 1928 Summer Olympics.

References

External links
 

Year of birth missing
Possibly living people
German male weightlifters
Olympic weightlifters of Germany
Weightlifters at the 1928 Summer Olympics
Place of birth missing